Bobby Gardiner (born 1939) is an Irish accordionist and lilter. He was recruited by Micheal O'Suilleabhain to the Music Department in University College Cork where he has been teaching traditional music for the last 25 years.

Biography
Bobby Gardiner was born in Aughdarra, Lisdoonvarna, the Burren area of County Clare. His Mother, Dilly, played a German two- row concertina and from her he learned his first tune – the fling What the devil ails you? His brother introduced him to a new Hohner two-row button accordion and after that, Bobby bought a grey Paolo Soprani accordion.

At the age of 15, he was asked to join the Kilfenora Céilí Band. In 1957 he joined Malachy Sweeney's Céilí Band from Armagh and traveled throughout Ireland as a professional musician.

In 1960, Bobby followed his brother Mike and sister Mary to New Haven, Connecticut. During the day he worked as a mechanic on the New York Railway while playing for dances with the likes of Paddy Killoran, Joe Cooley, Ed Reavey and Joe Derrane as well as doing some session work for Colonial Records. His solo recording career began when Justus O'Byrne De Witt heard him on the Jack Wade Ceili Band record and contacted him to record his first LP, "Memories of Clare" which was one of the first solo LPs by an Irish button accordion player. He also recorded with Paddy Killoran. The LP sold so well that he was asked back to do more recordings.

In 1963 Bobby was drafted into the US Army and was stationed at Fort Dix in New Jersey. On his weekends off, he would visit the Catskill Mountains in New York where he played with renowned musicians such as Joe Cooley, Sean McGlynn and Andy McGann.

He got married in Dublin on St. Patrick's Day, 17 March 1969, to Ann Kearney, a Tipperary singer. The newlyweds returned to America where their first daughter, Kelley was born. A year later they returnes to Ireland and they settled in Burncourt, a small village in south Tipperary near the town of Cahir, where they had two more daughters, Fiodhna and Lynda. All his children are accomplished musicians, carrying on the Irish music tradition, playing melodeon, whistles and concertina. In January 2009, Fiodhna in her band Inis Oirr, entertained the Irish president Mary McAleese in the Emirates Palace Hotel, Abu Dhabi, UAE.

Over the years Gardiner proceeded to make further recordings, most notably: "The Master's Choice" and "The Clare Shout". Gardiner has also traveled extensively with Comhaltas Ceoltóirí Éireann and is a member of the Brú Ború Troupe in Cashel, Co. Tipperary. They have also toured in China as well as Japan, Spain, Canada and the US.

He is an active accordion teacher in Tipperary, Waterford and Limerick. He was recruited by the pianist Micheal O'Suilleabhain to the Music Department in University College Cork where he has been teaching traditional music for the last 25 years. Some of his past students include Ciarán Ó Gealbháin and Benny McCarthy both of whom were part of Danú.

Playing style
Stylistically, Gardiner plays what is termed a wet tuned accordion. Other Irish proponents of wet tuning include: Joe Burke, Tony McMahon, Martin Connolly and Seamus Begley and as such Gardiner was one of the first Irish accordionist to master the art of the B/C accordion tuning. Bobby Gardiner's style of playing is particularly suited to Irish dancing because of his impeccable rhythm, creativity and his use of the single-button triplet, which has become his hallmark.

In "The Clare Shout" Bobby focuses on the one-row melodeon and the traditional art form of lilting, or mouth music. In the past, lilting was used to accompany dancers when instruments were unavailable.

Discography
Albums

Featured on

References

External links
 A Long Road from Lisdoonvarna: Sean Laffey meets accordion maestro Bobby Gardiner. Sean Laffey, Irish Music Magazine

Irish accordionists
Musicians from County Clare
Living people
1939 births
21st-century accordionists